Codonanthopsis ulei is a species of flowering plant in the family Gesneriaceae. This species is native to Mexico and America. It is an epiphyte and mainly grows in wet tropical biomes. This species was first published in 2013.

References

Gesnerioideae